Grace Archer (also Fairbrother) is a fictional character from the BBC's long-running radio soap, The Archers. She was one of the original characters and was played by Monica Gray and then Ysanne Churchman. The episode depicting her death was broadcast by the BBC on 22 September 1955, the same evening as the launch of ITV, so as to distract from it.

Storylines
Grace is the daughter of a wealthy English family. She falls in love with Phil Archer (Norman Painting), the son of a farmer, and they are married in April 1955. A few months later, a fire breaks out at the stables while the residents of the village are at a dinner in the church hall. Grace runs into the burning stables to try to save her friend's horse and, as she searches, a burning beam falls down onto her, leaving her trapped. Phil and the others at the party learn that Grace is trapped in the shed and they pull her from the wreckage. She is rushed to hospital, but is pronounced dead on arrival.

Reception
An audience of 20 million tuned into The Archers to hear Grace's death in 1955. A writer for the Sunday Mercury called Grace's death "One of the most controversial events in Ambridge history." Nick Collins, writing for The Daily Telegraph, named Grace's death as one of The Archers' most shocking storylines  In 2011, listeners voted Grace's death as their fifth most potent Archers memory in a poll conducted on the BBC's Archers website. The storyline received 9.7% of the vote. The scene is mentioned in the British sitcom The Good Life (series 3 episode 1).

References

External links
Grace Archer at BBC Radio 4

The Archers characters
Female characters in radio
Fictional British people
Radio characters introduced in 1955